The Crossbill Guides Foundation (CGF) is a European non-governmental organization for the conservation of the natural environment. It produces guidebooks on major natural areas in Europe, in order to create public awareness and participation in conservation activities.

External links
Official website

Nature conservation organisations based in Europe
Environmental education
Environmental organisations based in the Netherlands
European Union and the environment